Pfaffschwende is a municipality in the district of Eichsfeld in Thuringia, Germany.

References

Eichsfeld (district)